Ihor Volodymyrovych Soldat (born 10 March 1991) is a Ukrainian professional footballer who plays as a defender for LNZ Cherkasy.

Career
Soldat is product of different Kyivan youth systems. He made his professional debut on 30 September 2011, coming on as a second-half substitute for Stal Alchevsk in the Ukrainian First League.

Honours
Veres Rivne
 Ukrainian First League: 2020-21

Inhulets Petrove
Ukrainian Cup runner-up: 2018–19

References

External links
 
 
 

1991 births
Living people
Footballers from Kyiv
Ukrainian footballers
Association football defenders
FC Metalurh Donetsk players
FC Stal Alchevsk players
FC Stal-2 Alchevsk players
FC Hirnyk Kryvyi Rih players
FC Desna Chernihiv players
FC Inhulets Petrove players
NK Veres Rivne players
FC LNZ Cherkasy players
Ukrainian Premier League players
Ukrainian First League players
Ukrainian Second League players